Brenthia trimachaera is a species of moth of the family Choreutidae. It was described by Edward Meyrick in 1927. It is found on Samoa.

References

Brenthia
Moths described in 1927